Lazar Kojović (born September 5, 1994) is a Serbian–Canadian professional basketball player, who last played for Spartak Subotica of the Basketball League of Serbia.

Early life
Lazar Kojovic was born September 5, 1994 in Oakville, Ontario to his parents Aleksandar and Milica Kojovic, who were both born in Serbia. Kojovic played for Oakville Vytis while he was younger, until switching teams to Oakville Venom.

Early career
Kojović played college basketball for the McMaster Marauders of the U Sports men's basketball championship from 2012 to 2017. Over 19 championship games in 2016–17 season, he averaged 8.8 points, 4.4 rebounds and 2.0 assists per game.

Professional career
Prior to 2017–18 season, he signed for the Spartak Subotica from Serbia. He left Spartak after one season.

References

External links
 Player Profile at eurobasket.com
 Player Profile at realgm.com
 

1994 births
Living people
Canadian men's basketball players
Canadian expatriate basketball people in Serbia
Canadian people of Serbian descent
Basketball League of Serbia players
KK Spartak Subotica players
McMaster Marauders
Serbian expatriate basketball people in Canada
Serbian men's basketball players
Small forwards
Sportspeople from Oakville, Ontario
Basketball people from Ontario